Bečvář (feminine Bečvářová) is a Czech-language surname. Notable people with this surname include:

 Antonín Bečvář, Czech astronomer
 Josef Bečvář, former Chief of the General Staff of the Military of the Czech Republic
 Miloš Bečvář, Czech cross-country skier
 Roman Bečvář (handballer, born 1989), Czech handball player
 Roman Bečvář (handballer, born 1966), Czech handball player
 Václav Bečvář, Czech sport shooter
 Václav Bečvář (weightlifter), Czech weightlifter

Czech-language surnames
Occupational surnames